The Jamaica Union of Teachers (JUT) was a trade union representing schoolteachers in Jamaica.

The union was founded in 1894, the first trade union in Jamaica.  Its initial organisation was based on the British National Union of Teachers.  However, in its early years, the NUT functioned more as a professional association.  Its first president was the principal of the Rico Teachers Training College, who was from England.

The union was later led by J. A. Mason and W. F. Bailey, two headteachers.  They began campaigning to improve teachers' pay and working conditions, with considerable success.  They also succeeded in getting the British Parliament to abolish a £50,000 cap on the colonial governor's education budget.

In 1964, the union merged with the Association of Headmasters and Headmistresses, the Association of Teachers in Technical Institutions, the  Association of Teacher Training Staffs, and the Association of Assistant Masters and Mistresses, to form the Jamaica Teachers' Association.

References

Education trade unions
Trade unions established in 1894
Trade unions disestablished in 1964
Trade unions in Jamaica
1890s establishments in Jamaica